The Pirsaat is a river in Azerbaijan which flows through Ismailli, Shamakhi and Salyan Rayons. It discharges into the Caspian Sea near the village Xıdırlı. The river is fed by snow, rain and groundwater. Its largest tributary is Zoghalava.

On the right bank of the river there is Chukhuryurd village inhabited by molokans. The medieval Pirsaatchay Khanagah is at the Salyan portion of the river.

Further reading
Farajullayeva, F., 1983. "Hydrogeological Condition in Pirsaat River Basin of Shemakha Region", p. 125–129, in Academy of Sciences Press, Baku

References

Rivers of Azerbaijan
Salyan District (Azerbaijan)
Ismayilli District
Shamakhi District
Tributaries of the Caspian Sea